Edith Elmay (24 July 1936 – 7 August 2020) was an Austrian film and television actress.

Elmay died on 7 August 2020, at the age of 84.

Selected filmography
 Scandal in Bad Ischl (1957)
 The Street (1958)
 My Ninety Nine Brides (1958)
 Endangered Girls (1958)
 Girls for the Mambo-Bar (1959)
 My Daughter Patricia (1959)
 The Good Soldier Schweik (1960)
 Mariandl (1961)

References

Bibliography
 Popa, Dorin. O.W. Fischer: seine Filme, sein Leben. Wilhelm Heyne, 1989.

External links

1936 births
2020 deaths
Actresses from Vienna
Austrian film actresses
Austrian television actresses